Qeshlaq-e Olya (also Romanized as Qeshlāq-e ‘Olyā; also known as Qeshlāq-e Ḩājjī Ramaẕānī and Qeshlāq-e Ḩājj Ramaẕānī) is a village in Shur Dasht Rural District, Shara District, Hamadan County, Hamadan Province, Iran. At the 2006 census, its population was 176, in 37 families.

References 

Populated places in Hamadan County